Waynesboro is a city in Wayne County, Mississippi, United States. The population was 5,043 at the 2010 census. It is the county seat of Wayne County.

Geography
Waynesboro is located at  (31.674026, -88.643553), just east of the Chickasawhay River.

Demographics

2020 census

As of the 2020 United States Census, there were 4,567 people, 1,786 households, and 1,219 families residing in the city.

2010 census
As of the 2010 United States Census, there were 5,043 people living in the city. 61.9% were African American, 35.2% White, 0.2% Native American, 0.3% Asian, 0.1% Pacific Islander, 1.4% from some other race and 1.0% of two or more races. 1.9% were Hispanic or Latino of any race.

2000 census
As of the census of 2000, there were 5,197 people, 1,982 households, and 1,335 families living in the city. The population density was 781.6 people per square mile (301.7/km). There were 2,276 housing units at an average density of 342.3 per square mile (132.1/km). The racial makeup of the city was 41.54% White, 57.28% African American, 0.21% Native American, 0.37% Asian, 0.25% from other races, and 0.35% from two or more races. Hispanic or Latino of any race were 0.94% of the population.

There were 1,982 households, out of which 36.3% had children under the age of 18 living with them, 36.5% were married couples living together, 26.8% had a female householder with no husband present, and 32.6% were non-families. 29.6% of all households were made up of individuals, and 12.1% had someone living alone who was 65 years of age or older. The average household size was 2.53 and the average family size was 3.12.

In the city, the population was spread out, with 29.5% under the age of 18, 10.9% from 18 to 24, 25.5% from 25 to 44, 20.1% from 45 to 64, and 14.0% who were 65 years of age or older. The median age was 33 years. For every 100 females, there were 82.5 males. For every 100 females age 18 and over, there were 73.3 males.

The median income for a household in the city was $22,357, and the median income for a family was $27,754. Males had a median income of $29,602 versus $16,887 for females. The per capita income for the city was $12,946. About 31.1% of families and 32.7% of the population were below the poverty line, including 43.1% of those under age 18 and 17.4% of those age 65 or over.

Education
The city is served by the Wayne County School District.  The city's high school level education is provided by Wayne County High School (public) and Wayne Academy (private).

Notable people
 Three Major League Baseball players were born in Waynesboro: Claude Passeau (1909), Paul Busby (1918), and Jeff Branson (1967)
 Beauty queen Jalin Wood was born in Waynesboro; she won Miss Mississippi in 2004, then competed in the Miss America and Miss USA pageants
 Spencer Johnson, football defensive tackle for Minnesota Vikings, Buffalo Bills
 James Marion West, Sr., noted Texan oilman, cattle rancher, lumberman, and philanthropist, was born in Waynesboro (1871)
Benito Jones, pro football player for the Miami Dolphins

References

External links

Cities in Mississippi
Cities in Wayne County, Mississippi
County seats in Mississippi